Aecidium narcissi is a species of fungus in the Pucciniales order, causing rust in daffodils (Narcissus) and various wild Orchidaceae.

References

Bibliography 
Boerema & van Kesteren, in Versl. Meded. plziektenk. Dienst Wageningen 156 (Jaarb. 1979): [12-]14[-16]. 1980

External links 
 MycoBank

Fungal plant pathogens and diseases
Pucciniales